Juan Carlos Gómez (born 26 July 1973) is a Cuban former professional boxer who competed from 1995 to 2014. He held the WBC cruiserweight title from 1998 to 2002, and challenged once for the WBC heavyweight title in 2009.

Amateur career
Amateur Record: 158–12
1990 – Gold Medal World Junior Championships in Lima at 75 kg
1994 – Represented Cuba at the Chemistry Cup, his results were:

Defeated Jan Schwank (Germany) 9–4

Lost to Sven Ottke (Germany) 9–9

1994 – Competed at the USA Vs Cuba Cup in Ledyard, USA

Defeated Antonio Tarver (USA) 10–10

1995 – Represented Cuba at the Chemistry Cup, his results were:

Lost to Thomas Ulrich (Germany) 12–16

Professional career

Cruiserweight
The southpaw turned pro as a cruiser for Universum box promotions.

On 21 February 1998, in Mar del Plata, Argentina, Gómez won the WBC Cruiserweight title from reigning champion, Marcelo Fabian Dominguez via a unanimous decision.

Nicknamed "Black Panther", Gómez ruled the cruiserweight division from 1998–2001, successfully defending his WBC Cruiserweight title against ten different fighters.
Among his notable defenses were those against Dominguez (rematch), Imamu Mayfield and the smaller Jorge Castro who was KOd for the first time. James Toney declined a title shot when he was mandatory and later fought and beat Vassily Jirov.

He then vacated the title in February 2002 in order to move up to the Heavyweight ranks.

Heavyweight
In 2001 Gómez tested the waters in the heavyweight division and beaten durable veteran Al Cole (another former Cruiserweight champ) by TKO 6.  Gómez then moved back down to defend his title against Pietro Aurino, and after defeating Aurino he moved up to heavyweight permanently.

Gómez has had some success at heavyweight, capturing wins over Sinan Samil Sam and  David Defiagbon, but was shockingly TKO'd by fellow Cuban Yanqui Díaz in the first round in 2004.

Gómez defeated Don King promoted Oliver McCall via a ten-round decision on 15 October 2005, a result which was changed shortly thereafter to a no contest after Gomez failed a post-fight drug test due to a presence of cocaine.  Gómez vehemently denied the charge and backed this up by producing a negative test where no drugs were found in his system, though this test was taken two months after the fight.

After that Gómez announced that he converted to Islam. Gómez stated, '"After they stole my victory over Oliver McCall because of doping in October 2005 I was totally devastated. I swear that I never doped in my life. After the fight I went to the USA where I was built up by the Black Muslim community. That's why I converted to Islam. I thank Allah for giving me back my courage, energy and self esteem."' Gómez then returned to the ring on 15 December 2006 and on 19 October 2007, once again outpointed Oliver McCall winning the WBC International Heavyweight title in the process, then on 27 September 2008, at the Color Line Arena in Hamburg, Germany, Gómez defeated Vladimir Virchis to become the #1 contender for the WBC heavyweight title.

Gómez faced WBC Heavyweight titleholder Vitali Klitschko on 21 March in Stuttgart, Germany. Early in the fight, Gomez managed to frustrate Klitschko by diverting a large number of jabs, but eventually Klitschko was able to establish control using his immense size and superior punching power. He was floored by a big right hand in round seven, but managed to get up. After a barrage of punches in round nine, the referee stopped the fight.

On 27 March 2010, Gómez made a successful comeback, defeating Alexey Mazikin to win the WBA International Heavyweight title. He went on to defeat Alexander Kahl of Germany on April 9 in Hamburg to record his second victory in a fortnight.

Professional boxing record

Television viewership

Germany

References

External links

1973 births
Living people
Boxers from Havana
Heavyweight boxers
Cuban sportspeople in doping cases
Cuban emigrants to Germany
Doping cases in boxing
World Boxing Council champions
Cuban male boxers
Defecting sportspeople of Cuba
World cruiserweight boxing champions
Converts to Islam
Cuban Muslims